Me and Earl and the Dying Girl is a 2012 debut novel written by Jesse Andrews. The novel was released in hardcover by Amulet Books on March 1, 2012, and in paperback on May 7, 2013.

Plot 
Greg Gaines is a senior at Benson High School in Pittsburgh, Pennsylvania. A social loner, he navigates high school life by gaining everyone's acquaintance but staying clear of any particular clique. His only real friend is Earl Jackson, a fellow student from a poor and broken family. Greg and Earl have been friends since childhood but Greg will only (cautiously) claim that they are coworkers. The two spend most of their time making films together. Greg and Earl keep their filming ventures a secret from their peers, fearing ridicule for their mediocre projects.

One day, Greg's mother tells him that his childhood friend, Rachel Kushner, is diagnosed with acute myelogenous leukemia. Greg's mother wants him to rekindle their friendship and make her feel better. Although Greg had only befriended Rachel to try to get closer to her more attractive friend, Leah Katzenberg, he realizes that he cannot argue with his mother and calls her.

One day at school, Greg gets a text from Rachel saying that she would be starting chemotherapy the next day. Although he and Earl are accidentally on drugs at that moment, they make it to Rachel's, where Greg introduces her to Earl. The three go out for ice-cream, and Earl invites Rachel to watch some of their films. Greg is furious but does not stop him.

At school, Greg begins to fall back in his studies and soon comes close to failing all of his subjects. He is pressured by his parents to seriously apply to a college, but Greg is unsure of which one to choose. He discusses it with Rachel, who tells him that he should apply to a film school. Meanwhile, word gets around Benson High that Greg and Rachel have become close. Madison Hartner, Greg's long-time crush, comes to hear of his films from Rachel and persuades him to make a movie for Rachel. Greg and Earl come up with different ideas (including documentary footage, confessionals, and puppetry), and the end result, entitled Rachel the Film, is a mashup of everything they try out. To Greg's horror, the film is shown to the entire school during an assembly. Upset by this, Greg stops going to school altogether and scratches all the DVDs of his films.

A few days after the screening, Rachel dies. Greg goes to Earl to talk about it and finds out that he too destroyed his copies of their movies, and is done with film-making for good. Greg tells him that he would be applying to film school instead of college. Earl is opposed to this, saying that Rachel's death shouldn't be affecting his future plans.

In the epilogue, Greg reveals that he wrote the book as an explanation to his prospective college, the University of Pittsburgh, about why he fell back on schoolwork during his last school year. After his conversation with Earl, he had decided to retire from film-making, but on writing down his experience, decides that he shouldn't. He realizes that he was always unhappy because he was trying to be someone he wasn't, but was content when he was just himself. He makes up his mind to apply to film school within the next six months. The book ends with him wondering if he should put Rachel in his next film.

Reception
The book has a 3.6/5 rating on Goodreads and 4/5 rating on the Barnes & Noble website.

The book was among the 10 most challenged titles in American libraries in 2021.

Film adaptation 

An adaptation based on the novel was filmed in Pittsburgh beginning June 2014, directed by Alfonso Gomez-Rejon, with an adapted screenplay by the author, and starring Thomas Mann, RJ Cyler, Olivia Cooke, Connie Britton, Nick Offerman, Molly Shannon, and Jon Bernthal. The film premiered at the 2015 Sundance Film Festival, where it won both the Audience award (Dramatic) and the Grand Jury Prize (Dramatic).

References

External Links 
Books Unbanned, Brooklyn Public Library

2012 American novels
American novels adapted into films
Novels about cancer
Novels set in Pittsburgh
American young adult novels
2012 debut novels
Amulet Books books